Metalhead is a 2013 Icelandic drama film written and directed by Ragnar Bragason. It was screened in the Contemporary World Cinema section at the 2013 Toronto International Film Festival.

Plot
In the summer of 1983, a twelve-year-old girl, Hera Karlsdóttir, lives a normal life on her family farm in a close-knit community. This changes once she watches her older brother Baldur fall off a tractor before his long hair is scalped by its blades. He is rushed out by the family by truck for medical attention, but he dies of his injury. At his funeral, Hera glares at the portrait of Jesus on the wall and runs out of the church during the service. Returning home, she picks up her brother's guitar and immediately adopts his metal music and fashion, burning all of her old clothes.

Nine years later, as Hera is a young adult, life in her home has not improved. She and her parents are still in shock and grief over Baldur's death. Meanwhile, her mother and father, Droplaug and Karl, pursue community life by participating in the village church choir. There, they meet the new priest, Janus, who is liberal and rumored to be homosexual. In the local community, Hera's lifestyle stands out. She is bullied by other youths, who call her a Satanist. She frequently gets into trouble, doing things such as playing her guitar too loudly in the house and drunkenly stealing her neighbor's tractor. She gets a job at a slaughterhouse, but is soon fired for playing metal music over the loudspeakers and scaring off the livestock. She goes with her family to a church sermon, but disrupts it by smoking inside. As she walks out and grieves over Baldur's grave, Janus tries reaching out to her, but she initially rejects him. She goes to a community ball, but is kicked out after trying to start a moshpit.

Her childhood friend Knútur comes with her as she heads home, where they have sex. He tries to start a conversation with her afterwards, but she turns away and leaves the room. One morning, Hera dons corpse paint and furiously herds all of her family's cattle out of the barn in the middle of the winter. Later that night, Knútur comes over to her house to propose to her, but she rejects him and tosses the ring out of his hands. In the wake of Hera's behaviour, her parents called over Janus for counseling. He agrees to help her, but then tries asking Karl and Droplaug about the state of their relationship. They initially refuse to talk about it, but Karl later breaks down, blaming himself for his son's death. Afterwards, he and Droplaug open up to each other about it more and, to Hera's surprise as she comes home, their relationship starts mending.

Janus tries reaching out to Hera again, but Hera tries again to resist. She claims that Christians would not understand her music when he tries discussing it with her, but he then reveals his Eddie tattoo to her. They start having a friendly discourse on heavy metal music. However, when he tries talking to her on an emotional level, she instantly attempts to seduce him, causing him to leave. Meanwhile, she sees a news report about the Norwegian black metal scene and the arson attacks associated with it. Immensely interested in it, she records a black metal demo of her own and sends a copy of it away to the post office. As Janus still tries reaching out to her, they still talk and she shows him her metal recordings. One night, though, she comes over to his house and starts exhibiting romantic feelings for him, but he then confesses that he does not feel mutually about her.

Emotionally estranged, Hera sets fire to the community church and runs away from her parents' home. Gathering supplies and a gun, she heads off into the nearby mountains to stay in a hunting shack. However, as she could not survive for long there, she returns home. Upon entering her house, she walks in on a town meeting. She breaks down and is forgiven by her neighbors and friends. As they discuss reconciliation for her actions, the townspeople explained that they will not release her identity as the arsonist. She offers to pay for the damage to the church herself, but out of empathy and realism, the townspeople stated that they will all repay and repair it together. Hera then moves in with Knútur and his family, but is pushed into seemingly giving up metal altogether. She becomes pacified and "normal", but not happy.

Things change however when three young men from Norway make a surprise visit for Hera at her parents' house. They had come across her demo on the tape trading scene in Oslo and, highly impressed with it, want to release it on their record label. Later her mother talks to her and, perceiving Hera's discontent, tells her that it is important for her to be happy. One night, after a day of rebuilding the church with the Norwegians and townspeople, she tries apologizing to Knútur. She tries saying that she loves him, but not romantically. Emotionally inflamed, he furiously confronts her for mistreating him and leaves.

Some time later, Hera, clad again in heavy metal attire, forms a band with the Norwegians and performs for the entire town. They try playing her black metal song, but the audience cannot tolerate it and they stop playing it. They start covering Lynyrd Skynyrd, which the audience is enthusiastic to listen to, but the band does not want to continue playing it. They ultimately play a modified version of the black metal song, with clean vocals, which both the audience and the band enjoyed. Later, Hera is back home in her room and her mother walks in and plays Megadeth on her sound system. Karl walks in and the film ends with all three of them dancing to it.

Cast
 Thora Bjorg Helga as Hera Karlsdóttir
 Diljá Valsdóttir as 11-year-old Hera
 Ingvar Eggert Sigurðsson as Karl, Hera's father
 Halldóra Geirharðsdóttir as Droplaug, Hera's mother
 Sveinn Ólafur Gunnarsson as Janus, the new priest
 Hannes Óli Ágústsson as Knútur, Hera's fiancé
 Mikael Kaaber as 11-year-old Knútur
 Þórunn Arna Kristjánsdóttir as Elsa, Hera's childhood friend
 Urður Heimisdóttir as 11-year-old Elsa
 Óskar Logi Ágústsson as Baldur, Hera's brother
 Þröstur Leó Gunnarsson as Einar
 Magnús Ólafsson as Erlingur
 Hilmar Wollan III as Øystein
 Ole Erik Furu as Yngve
 Sigrún Edda Björnsdóttir as Anna
 Pétur Einarsson as Traveller

Reception
Metalhead was well received by critics, earning a rating of "90% fresh" on Rotten Tomatoes.

References

External links
 

2013 films
2013 drama films
Films directed by Ragnar Bragason
Icelandic drama films
2010s Icelandic-language films
Heavy metal films
Films about musical groups
Black metal
Films about arson
Films set in 1983